Polynoncus is a genus of beetles of the Family Trogidae. It contains the following species:

Polynoncus aeger (Guerin-Meneville, 1844) (South America)
Polynoncus aricensis (Gutierrez, 1950) (South America)
Polynoncus bifurcatus (Vaurie, 1962) (South America)
Polynoncus brasiliensis (Vaurie, 1962) (South America)
Polynoncus brevicollis (Eschscholtz, 1822) (South America)
Polynoncus bullatus (Curtis, 1845) (Chile, Argentina)
Polynoncus burmeisteri (Pittino, 1987) (Argentina)
Polynoncus chilensis (Harold, 1872) (Chile, Argentina)
Polynoncus crypticus (Diéguez, 2019) (Chile)
Polynoncus diffluens (Vaurie, 1962) (Chile)
Polynoncus ecuadorensis Vaurie, 1962 (Ecuador)
Polynoncus erugatus Scholtz, 1990 (Argentina)
Polynoncus galapagoensis (Van Dyke, 1953) (Galapagos Islands)
Polynoncus gemmifer (Blanchard, 1846) (South America)
Polynoncus gemmingeri (Harold, 1872) (Panama to Argentina)
Polynoncus gibberosus Scholtz, 1990 (Chile)
Polynoncus gordoni (Steiner, 1981) (Peru)
Polynoncus guttifer (Harold, 1868) (South America)
Polynoncus haafi Vaurie, 1962 (Argentina)
Polynoncus hemisphaericus (Burmeister, 1876) (Argentina, Chile)
Polynoncus juglans (Ratcliffe, 1978) (Brazil, Guyana)
Polynoncus longitarsis (Harold, 1872) (Argentina, Chile)
Polynoncus mirabilis Pittino, 1987 (Chile, Argentina)
Polynoncus neuquen (Vaurie, 1962) (Chile, Argentina)
Polynoncus parafurcatus (Pittino, 1987) (Argentina, Brazil)
Polynoncus patagonicus (Blanchard, 1846) (Argentina)
Polynoncus patriciae Pittino, 1987 (Argentina, Uruguay)
Polynoncus pedestris (Harold, 1872) (Argentina)
Polynoncus peruanus (Erichson, 1847) (South America)
Polynoncus pilularius (Germar, 1824) (South America)
Polynoncus pittinoi (Costa-Silva & Diéguez, 2020) (Argentina)
Polynoncus sallei (Harold, 1872) (Madagascar, Ecuador, Peru)
Polynoncus seymourensis (Mutchler, 1925) (Galapagos Islands)
Polynoncus tenebrosus (Harold, 1872) (Ecuador)
Polynoncus vazdemelloi (Huchet & Costa-Silva, 2018) (Brazil)

References

 
Trogidae